Events from the year 1629 in Sweden

Incumbents
 Monarch – Gustaf II Adolf

Events

 12 February – Battle of Górzno
 
 
 
 
 25 September – Truce of Altmark

Births

 August 18 – Agneta Horn, memoir writer  (died 1672) 
 21 October – Adolph John I, Count Palatine of Kleeburg,  (died 1689) 
 Ebba Sparre, courtier  (died 1662)

Deaths

 18 August - Vendela Skytte, writer, poet and Lady of Letters  (born 1608)

References

 
Years of the 17th century in Sweden
Sweden